is a passenger railway station located in the city of Kuki, Saitama, Japan, operated jointly by East Japan Railway Company (JR East) and the private railway operator Tōbu Railway.

Lines
It is also a station on the JR East Tōhoku Main Line (Utsunomiya Line) and is 48.9 km from the starting point of that line at Tokyo Station.

Station layout

JR East

The JR East portion of the station has one ground-level island platform and one ground-level side platform serving three tracks, connected to the station building by a footbridge. The station has a “Midori no Madoguchi” staffed ticket office.

Platforms

Tobu

The Tōbu Station consists of two island platform serving four tracks, connected to the station building by a footbridge.

Platforms

History
The JR East Tōhoku Line (Utsunomiya Line) station opened on 16 July 1885. The Tōbu station opened on 27 August 1899.
From 17 March 2012, station numbering was introduced on all Tōbu lines, with Kuki Station becoming "TI-02".

Passenger statistics
In fiscal 2019, the Tōbu  station was used by an average of 51,656 passengers daily (boarding passengers only)..The JR portion of the station was used by an average of 35,347 passengers daily (boarding passengers only).

See also
 List of railway stations in Japan

References

External links

 Kuki Station information (Tobu) 
JR East Station Information 

Tōhoku Main Line
Tobu Isesaki Line
Utsunomiya Line
Stations of East Japan Railway Company
Stations of Tobu Railway
Railway stations in Saitama Prefecture
Railway stations in Japan opened in 1899
Kuki, Saitama